Shrager is a surname. Notable people with the surname include:

 David Shrager (1935–2005), American lawyer
 Rosemary Shrager (born 1951), English chef